The 2016 Abierto Tampico was a professional tennis tournament played on outdoor hard courts. It was the 4th edition of the tournament and part of the 2016 ITF Women's Circuit, offering a total of $50,000+H in prize money. It took place in Tampico, Mexico, on 24–30 October 2016.

Singles main draw entrants

Seeds 

 1 Rankings as of 17 October 2016.

Other entrants 
The following player received a wildcard into the singles main draw:
  Giuliana Olmos
  Nazari Urbina
  Marcela Zacarías
  Sofya Zhuk

The following players received entry from the qualifying draw:
  Hanna Chang
  Nicole Coopersmith
  Mara Schmidt
  Naomi Totka

The following players received entry by lucky loser spots:
  Karla de la Luz Montalvo
  Eva Raszkiewicz
  Andrea Renee Villarreal

The following player received entry by a junior exempt:
  Katie Swan

Champions

Singles

 Sofya Zhuk def.  Varvara Flink, 6–4, 6–3

Doubles

 Mihaela Buzărnescu /  Elise Mertens def.  Usue Maitane Arconada /  Katie Swan, 6–0, 6–2

External links 
 2016 Abierto Tampico at ITFtennis.com

2016 ITF Women's Circuit
2016 in Mexican tennis
Abierto Tampico